Deadstar 2 is the debut studio album by American rapper Smokepurpp. It was released on December 13, 2019, by Alamo Records and Interscope Records.

The album features guest appearances from frequent collaborator Lil Pump, as well as Denzel Curry, Ty Dolla Sign, Lil Skies, Moneybagg Yo and Trippie Redd. Smokepurpp describes it as his "best body of work."

Background 
Smokepurpp released his debut commercial mixtape Deadstar in September 2017. He announced its sequel Deadstar 2 in mid-2018. The initial track listing showed Lil Pump and Gunna as featured artists. The album was delayed and sometimes even scrapped multiple times, due to being leaked online before its release. A track that was originally set to be on the album has also leaked, titled "No Problem" and features Kanye West. In an interview, Smokepurpp revealed he had to omit the track from the record due to Kanye West giving up on putting out secular music.

Artwork 
Smokepurpp revealed the album's cover art on November 3, 2019. It is inspired by a photograph of grunge icon Kurt Cobain, taken two months before his death. Similarly, the album's prequel, Deadstar also references a rock artist on its cover artwork, GG Allin, particularly an image of his open casket.

Track listing 
Notes

The track "All For Me" was originally came from the Trippie Redd mixtape A Love Letter To You 4, and is an edited version of the same track, missing the original XXXTENTACION voice recording.

Charts

References 

Smokepurpp albums
2019 albums